Şakir Selim (sometimes also Shakir Selim, b. 1942 - d. 2008) was a Crimean Tatar poet, publicist, translator.

Life 
Şakir Selim was born in the village of Biyuk-Ass of the Crimean Autonomous Soviet Socialist Republic. Şakir, the 8th child of the family, was deported together with his family first to the Ural Mountains and then to Turkestan  on May 18, 1944. When he was seven, he lost his mother. He finished his high school in 1958 in Samargand. In 1974, Selim graduated from the Philological Faculty of Samargand University.

Şakir Selim sent his poem "Mother", written during his military service, to the Leninskoye Znamya newspaper which was the only press body of the Crimean Tatar language at that time in the Soviet Union. This poem dedicated to his mother has been published in 1963. His poetry activity began with that. After his military service, Şakir Selim entered to the Russian Language and Literature Faculty at Samargand State University.

The latest poetry book of Şakir Salim was the "Kırımname", presented to readers in 2006. He died on November 18, 2008 in Simferopol.

References 

Crimean poets
Crimean Tatar culture
1942 births
2008 deaths